Mockava is a village in Lithuania six km from the border with Poland. The Mockava Railway Station is located northeast of Mockava in the village of Zelionka.

According to the 2011 census, the population of Mockava was 59.

Transport 

The Rail Baltica project runs through the area. A break-of-gauge facility at Mockava allows rolling stock to be exchanged between the European standard gauge, and the  gauge of former satellite states of the Soviet Union.  To speed up though traffic, a track-gauge changing facility operates, which includes the SUW 2000 variable gauge axle system that allows fitted trains to pass through the break of gauge at walking pace.

References 

Villages in Marijampolė County